Dorsten (Westphalian: Dössen) is a town in the district of Recklinghausen in North Rhine-Westphalia, Germany and has a population of about 75,000.

Dorsten is situated on the western rim of Westphalia bordering the Rhineland. Its historical old town lies on the south bank of the river Lippe and the Wesel–Datteln Canal and was granted city rights in 1251. During the twentieth century, the town was enlarged in its north by the villages of the former Herrlichkeit Lembeck. While Dorsten's northern districts are thus shaped by the  rural Münsterland with its many historical castles, just south of the town the Ruhr region begins, Germany's largest urban agglomeration with more than seven million inhabitants.

The exact linguistic derivation of the word "Dorsten" is unknown, leaving the meaning of the town's name unclear.

History
Archaeological findings show that the area was already populated during the Neolithic and Bronze Ages, from about 4000 BC onwards. The Romans established a military camp in Dorsten-Holsterhausen in 11 BC and Varus passed through it in 9 BC on his way to the Battle of the Teutoburg Forest.

From around 700 AD onwards, the Archbishopric of Cologne began to evangelise the area around Dorsten. Archbishop Konrad von Hochstaden, together with the Count of Cleves, granted Dorsten the city rights in 1251. Due to its economically favourable position on the river Lippe, the town became a member of the Hanseatic League of international trading cities and turned into the richest town in the Vest Recklinghausen.

In 1488, Franciscan friars established a friary which continues to exist today as the world’s oldest permanently existing cloister of this order. The monks founded Gymnasium Petrinum in 1642 and in 1699 the Ursulines set up a cloister including a boarding school for girls. However, the Thirty Years’ War (1618–48), the Hessian War and the continuous occupation by various forces badly derogated Dorsten’s medieval wealth. On 9 February 1633, Hesse-Cassel captured the town of Dorsten without resistance from the Electorate of Cologne and the Vest of Recklinghausen and, in the years that followed, it was turned into the strongest fortress in the region. As a result, attempts were made to recapture it. The first siege in 1636 was unsuccessful, but in 1641, a second Siege of Dorsten resulted in considerable destruction of the town and the eventual surrender of the garrison.

It was only during the Industrial Revolution of the nineteenth century that Dorsten returned to its former prosperity. Spinning, weaving and metal casting industries found their way into town and in 1912, the first coal mine opened. Between 1929 and 1975, surrounding villages became districts of the gradually enlarging town of Dorsten. Only a few days before the end of the Second World War, the historical old town was almost completely destroyed in an Allied air raid. 319 people died in the air raids on Dorsten and 700 families were made homeless. However, after 1945, the town’s centre was rebuilt on its historical foundations and thus still resembles its medieval shape today.

Dorsten is widely known today for its Jewish Museum of Westphalia which was established in 1987. In 2001, the last coal mine closed and the town celebrated its 750th jubilee with a festival in the old town.

Gallery

Main sights
Schloss Lembeck
Historical Town Hall
Jewish Museum of Westphalia
Historical Tüshaus Mill

Transport
Dorsten has its own airfield.

Dorsten station is on the Duisburg–Quakenbrück and the Gelsenkirchen-Bismarck–Winterswijk railways and is served by regional services to Gladbeck, Bottrop, Essen, Dortmund, Borken (Westf) and Coesfeld (Westf).

Notable people
Dirk Balster (born 1966), rowing world champion 1989–1991
Franz Bronstert (1895–1967), engineer and painter
Cornelia Funke (born 1958), children's and young people's book author
Agnes Hürland-Büning (1926–2009), controversial politician (CDU)
Julia Lohmann (born 1951), painter and sculptor
Winfried Nachtwei (born 1946), politician (The Greens) and Member of Bundestag 1994–2009
Manfred Nielson (born 1955), admiral
Günter Pröpper (born 1941), footballer
Thorsten Streppelhoff (born 1969), rowing world champion in 1991 and 1993
Winfried Toll (born 1955), conductor, singer and composer of classical music
Kevin Vennemann (born 1977), writer

Twin towns – sister cities

Dorsten is twinned with:

 Crawley, England, United Kingdom
 Dormans, France
 Ernée, France
 Hainichen in Germany
 Hod HaSharon, Israel
 Newtownabbey, Northern Ireland, United Kingdom
 Rybnik, Poland
 Waslala, Nicaragua

References

Towns in North Rhine-Westphalia
Recklinghausen (district)
Members of the Hanseatic League